Colonel Ruggiero Capodivento (born 24 July 1963) is a member of the Italian Carabinieri, the 20th Commander of the Multinational Specialized Unit, currently serving as deputy commander of the Carabinieri Legion "Toscana" and Commander of the international military mission "MIADIT 16", in Djibouti.

Military career
He joined the Carabinieri in 1983 with the rank of carabiniere ausiliario. He attended the Military Academy of Modena between 1984 al 1986, acquiring the rank of sub-lieutenant. Then, he completed the military studies at the Carabinieri Officers' School of Rome. 
In 1988 he was promoted lieutenant and was chosen as commander of a platoon of cadets at the Carabinieri Marshal School of Florence. From 1990 to 1991 he led the Criminal Investigation Team of the Carabinieri Company of Mestre (VE, Italy).

At the end of 1991 he is promoted to the rank of captain and he is appointed to the command of the Carabinieri Company of Reggio Emilia.

In 1997 he takes move to the Carabinieri Company of Pozzuoli (NA, Italy), as the commander of the unit.
In the next years he is promoted to rank of major and led a section at the Carabinieri Officers' School of Rome.

From 2004 to 2009 he is detached as a staff officer at General Defence Headquarters in Rome. In 2004 he is deployed in Sarajevo for the NATO mission SFOR (Bosnia Herzegovina). In 2005, he is promoted to the rank of lieutenant colonel.

In 2009 he is promoted to colonel and the same year is assigned to the Carabinieri Training Schools’ Command in Rome as departmental chief. 
From 2012 to 2013 he was detached to Kochi (India) as the Carabinieri officer for the international controversy of the Enrica Lexie case.

In 2013 he commanded the Carabinieri district of Treviso and in 2016 he is nominated Chief of Staff of the Carabinieri Legion "Toscana".

From 15 September 2018 he has been the 20th Commander of the Multinational Specialized Unit of KFOR. He ended his service as KFOR-MSU Commander on 16 October 2019 and he was awarded with the Kosovo Medal of Merit from the Kosovo Police and the Minister of Internal Affairs Ekrem Mustafa and the Presidential Military Medal, the highest Kosovo military decoration, from the President Hashim Thaçi.

After coming back to homeland, in 2019, he returned to be the Chief of Staff of the Carabinieri Legion "Toscana". On 5 October 2020 he left the position of Chief of Staff to be appointed as the Deputy Commander of the same unit.

From 31 January 2022 to 31 May 2022, he has been the Commander of the MIADIT 16, deployed in Djibouti, a military mission with the aim to train the Somali Armed Forces alongside the local security forces.

Since the 8th of February, 2023 he is back as Commander of the Multinational Specialized Unit of KFOR.

Studies 
Graduated in high school as a chartered building surveyor in 1982 and in Law at the University of Macerata in 1993. He then obtained a degree in "Security Sciences" at the University of Rome "Tor Vergata" in 2003 and a Master's degree in Strategic Sciences at the University of Turin.

He also qualified as a lawyer in 1999.

Personal life
He is married and has two sons.

Related voices
Carabinieri
Multinational Specialized Unit

References

External links 

  Official Ruggiero Capodivento's Twitter account

1963 births
Living people
Carabinieri
People of the Kosovo War
People from Florence
University of Macerata alumni
University of Turin alumni